The University of the Autonomous Regions of the Nicaraguan Caribbean Coast (Spanish: Universidad de las Regiones Autónomas de la Costa Caribe Nicaragüense, abbreviated URACCAN), is a university founded in 1994. It is described as an "intercultural university community for indigenous peoples and ethnic communities".

Campuses
The university has four campuses located throughout the country's two autonomous regions.

North Caribbean Coast Autonomous Region
Bilwi
Siuna

South Caribbean Coast Autonomous Region
Bluefields
Nueva Guinea

References

External links

 



Universities in Nicaragua
1992 establishments in Nicaragua
Educational institutions established in 1992